21st Century Girl is the sixth studio album of the indie group Brazzaville.

Track listing

The Clouds in Camarillo

The Clouds in Camarillo is a name of the radio-single released by Brazzaville in 2007. The song was included to the album 21st Century Girl.

The Plot and Minerva's addition
Camarillo is the name of the city in the US state of California. Three miles from Camarillo is Camarillo State Mental Hospital, which opened a disease like schizophrenia. According to eyewitnesses, during the period from 1936 to 1996 in the hospital from the experiments died large number of patients. In the same hospital spent the last years the mother of soloist of the band Brazzaville David Brown. Song is a poetic translation of one of her letters.

Original song, "Top of the World" was written by Mikhail Galper (ex Korneev) an Ivan Korolyov in 2006. David Arthur Brown heard this song in summer of 2007 during his visit in Moscow for Siberian tour. He did his remake version in August, and in September, Mikhail made a suggestion to record his voice.

Music video
In 2007 for the song was filmed video, which was loaded on YouTube by Minerva's profile. The video shows David Brown and Mikhail Korneev in the city of Camarillo dressed in white clothes for the mentally ill. The most attention is paid to the woman, which is dancing on the road and playing with teddy baby in a pram. Also the singers are shown closed in a cage with the woman. 
At the end of the video the woman walks into the sea and disappears into it.

The video was shown on popular TV Channels of United States, Russia and Ukrainian channel M1.

Personnel 
 Richie Alvarez – keyboards
 Paco Jordi – guitars, backing vocals
 Brady Lynch – bass
David Brown – synthesizer, guitar, keyboards, tambourine, vocals, shaker, audio production, cover photo
Janet Brown – photography
Narcis Coromina – saxophone
Maria Pi Sunier De Gispert – vocals
Juan Fortea – electric guitar, vocals
Rick Hake – synthesizer
Ivan Knight – bongos, drums, shaker, hi hat
Mikhail Korneev – vocals
Erik Radloff – drums
Todd Richard – synthesizer, guitar, audio production, hammond B3
Marina Sala – accordion, vocals
Natauko Sugao – trumpet
Naomi Wedman – violin

References

Brazzaville (American band) albums
2008 albums